Loko may refer to:

 Port Loko, Sierra Leone, Africa
 Loko people, a people of Sierra Leone
 Loko language, a language of Sierra Leone
 Loco (loa) or Loko, a figure in Haitian Vodou belief
 Loko, a goddess in Dahomey mythology
 Lokomotiv (disambiguation), several sport clubs sometimes abbreviated as Loko
 Loko, Estonia, a village in Põlva Parish, Põlva County, Estonia
 Loko, Nasarawa, a town in Nasarawa State, Nigeria
 Four Loko, a line of alcoholic beverages, originally marketed as energy drinks
 David Loko, Papua New Guinean former rugby league player
 Jacob Loko (born 1992), Australian rugby league player
 Patrice Loko (born 1970), French former footballer

See also
 Loco (disambiguation)

Language and nationality disambiguation pages